Anne Sauvagnargues (born 16 March 1961) is a French philosopher specializing in the work of Gilles Deleuze.

Biography 

A former student of the École Normale Supérieure in Fontenay-aux-Roses, she taught at the École normale supérieure of Lyon and has been professor at the University Paris X since 2010,

She co-heads with Fabienne Brugère the series "Art Line" for the University Press of France.

Bibliography 
In English:
 Sauvagnargues, Anne (2013) Deleuze and Art, Trans. by Samantha Bankston. London: A & C Black.
 Sauvagnargues, Anne (2015) Artmachines: Deleuze, Guattari, Simondon Trans. by Suzanne Verderber. Edinburgh: Edinburgh University Press.

In French:
 Maudits mot. Se parler, Paris, Le Seuil, coll. " Philo ", 1996 en littérature, 
 La Nature, avec Yue Dai Yun, Paris, Éditions Desclée de Brouwer, coll. " Proches lointains ", 1999 en littérature 
 " Deleuze, de l'animal à l'art ", dans La philosophie de Deleuze, avec François Zourabichvili et Paola Marrati, Paris, Presses universitaires de France, coll. " Quadrige. Manuels ", 2004 en littérature, 
 Deleuze et l'art, Paris, PUF, coll. " Lignes d'art ", 2005 en littérature, 
 Comme des bêtes : Ours, chat, cochon et Cie, avec Bernard Fibicher, Magali Moulinier, Marie Alamir, Milan, Italie, 5 Continents Éditions, 2008 en littérature, 
 Deleuze, l'empirisme transcendantal, Paris, PUF, coll. " Philosophie d'aujourd'hui ", 2010 en littérature,

See also 
 Levi Bryant

Notes and references

External links 
 "The Lacano Marxism Deleuze and Guattari," ENSmédia conference

1961 births
Living people
French philosophers
École Normale Supérieure alumni
Academic staff of the University of Paris